Péter Kincses (born 23 May 1980) is a Hungarian footballer who last played as a midfielder for Vasas SC.

Kincses joined Vasas SC from Újpest FC in July 2009.

External links
 Profile 

1980 births
Living people
Hungarian footballers
Association football midfielders
Újpest FC players
MTK Budapest FC players
Kecskeméti TE players
BKV Előre SC footballers
FC Tatabánya players
Szombathelyi Haladás footballers
Lombard-Pápa TFC footballers
Vasas SC players